Sorkheh Dar ( may refer to:
 Sorkheh Darreh, Alborz, Iran
 Sorkheh Deh-e Olya, Lorestan, Iran